The Well-Tempered Critic may refer to:

 The Well-Tempered Critic (Davies book), a 1981 collection of essays by Robertson Davies
 The Well-Tempered Critic (Frye book), a 1963 collection of essays by Northrop Frye